Taylor Boathouse is a historic boathouse located at Lyme in Jefferson County, New York, constructed about 1905.

It is a two-story, two by four bay wood-frame building resting on a concrete base, which forms a walkway around three sides of the building. On the second story are spacious servants' quarters.

It was listed on the National Register of Historic Places in 1990.

References

Boathouses in the United States
Transportation buildings and structures on the National Register of Historic Places in New York (state)
Colonial Revival architecture in New York (state)
Houses completed in 1905
Shingle Style architecture in New York (state)
Transportation buildings and structures in Jefferson County, New York
National Register of Historic Places in Jefferson County, New York
Boathouses on the National Register of Historic Places
1905 establishments in New York (state)